Bennett Brook is a stream that runs from Whiteman Park to the Swan River in Western Australia.

Overview
Approximately half of the catchment area is covered by Whiteman Park and the Gnangara Pine Plantation. The rest of the catchment is urbanised, covering the suburbs of Ballajura, Beechboro, Bennett Springs, Kiara, Lockridge, Malaga, Morley and Noranda. The tributaries to the west are highly modified and partially underground. The tributaries to the north are mostly natural.

Upstream areas only flow between August and November. Groundwater pumping from the Gnangara Mound has made the flow lower than the natural flow. Downstream areas flow year round. Urbanisation has made the flow downstream higher than the natural flow, due to higher surface runoff from roads and houses.

Crossing

In the late 1930s the local authority, the Swan Road Board considered a bridge to cross the brook.  In the 1980s, the status of the area relative to Indigenous concerns and environmental concerns made bridge making and other activity more restricted.

Fauna
Animals found in and around Bennett Brook include:
 Chelodina oblonga – southwestern snake-necked turtle
 Westralunio carteri – species of freshwater mussel
 Isoodon obesulus – quenda or southern brown bandicoot
 Trichosurus vulpecula – brush-tailed possum
 Hydromys chrysogaster – water rat

Name
Bennett Brook is named after Matilda Bennett, the wife of John Septimus Roe.

See also

Bennett Brook Railway
List of watercourses in Western Australia

References

Swan River (Western Australia)
Swan Coastal Plain
Whiteman Park